The 2016 Tour de Luxembourg is the 76th edition of the Tour de Luxembourg cycle stage race. It is part of the 2016 UCI Europe Tour as a 2.HC event.

Schedule

Teams
15 teams were selected to take place in the 2016 Tour de Luxembourg. Five of these were UCI WorldTeams; seven were UCI Professional Continental teams and three were UCI Continental teams.

Stages

Prologue
1 June 2016 – Luxembourg

Stage 1
2 June 2016 – Luxembourg to Hesperange,

Stage 2
3 June 2016 – Rosport to Schifflange,

Stage 3
4 June 2016 – Eschweiler to Differdange,

Stage 4
4 June 2016 – Mersch to Luxembourg,

Classification leadership

References

Tour de Luxembourg
Tour de Luxembourg
Tour de Luxembourg